Bangla TV is a Bengali-language satellite television channel based in the United Kingdom and Bangladesh. It was established in the United Kingdom on 16 September 1999, targeting Bengali audiences both there and in Europe. It commenced transmissions in Bangladesh on 19 May 2017.

History
Established on 16 September 1999 by Feroze Khan, Bangla TV is the first Bengali language television channel launched in the United Kingdom. It operated as a subscription-only channel until 2005, following the arrival of Channel S, a rival channel providing a free-to-air service targeting its programming specifically for the Bengali Sylheti community in the United Kingdom. Following the launch of Channel S, Bangla TV also switched over to a non-subscription based model and to date have been providing the service free.

In November 2013, Bangla TV gained a license from the Bangladesh Telecommunication Regulatory Commission to broadcast in Bangladesh. It had also received its frequency allocation in January 2015, and officially began broadcasting in that country on 19 May 2017. In July 2017, Bangla TV, along with four other television channels in Bangladesh, signed an agreement with UNICEF to air children's programming for one minute. On 19 May 2019, Bangla TV, along with six other channels, began broadcasting via the Bangabandhu-1 satellite after signing an agreement with BSCL.

Temporary removals
Bangla TV was removed from Sky channel 786 on 1 July 2010, before returning on 9 July, no explanation was provided. Bangla TV was again removed from the Sky EPG during December 2010 before being found in serious breach of Ofcom rules. The channel returned again on 17 June 2011, under new management. Bangla TV was again removed from the Sky EPG during December 2013 and January 2014 before returning on 10 February 2014. It was again removed on 7 August 2014 and continues to have intermittent TV transmission.

See also
British Bangladeshi
List of television stations in Bangladesh

References

External links

Television channels and stations established in 1999
Television channels in the United Kingdom
Television channels in Bangladesh
Bengali-language television channels
British Bangladeshi mass media
1999 establishments in the United Kingdom